Isla Escudo de Veraguas is a small (4.3 km2) isolated Caribbean island of the Republic of Panama. Despite its name, it is not part of the province of Veraguas, but rather Bocas del Toro. Although located only 17 km from the coastline in the Golfo de los Mosquitos and isolated for only about 9000 years, several animals found on the island are distinct from their mainland counterparts, and two mammal species or subspecies  are recognized as occurring only on the island: the fruit bat Dermanura watsoni incomitata and the sloth Bradypus pygmaeus (also known as the pygmy sloth). These two taxa and the worm salamander Oedipina maritima are all considered to be critically endangered due to their being unique to the small island. Other mammals found on the island include the bats Glossophaga soricina, Micronycteris megalotis, Carollia brevicauda, Myotis riparius, and Saccopteryx leptura, the spiny rat Hoplomys gymnurus, and the opossum Caluromys derbianus. It houses over 11,000 species, such as the pygmy sloth. The island has an average high temperature of 23 degrees Celsius and a low temperature of 12 degrees Celsius.

Escudo de Veraguas is traditionally considered the birthplace of the Ngöbe–Buglé people. Until 1995 the island remained largely unpopulated, but since that time Ngöbe–Buglé fishermen from nearby coastal towns moved in, first using the island as a base for fishing parties and later settling permanently.  In 2012, about 120 fishermen and their families were settled on the island.

References

Literature cited

Escudo de Veraguas
Bocas del Toro Province